Joe Gibbs Racing is an American professional stock car racing organization owned and operated by former Washington Redskins coach Joe Gibbs, which first started racing on the NASCAR circuit in 1991. His son, J. D. Gibbs, ran the team with him until his death in 2019.

For the team's first sixteen seasons, Gibbs ran cars from General Motors. During that period, the team won their first three championships: two in Pontiac Grand Prixs and one in a Chevrolet Monte Carlo. Despite this, Joe Gibbs Racing announced during the 2007 season that they would be ending their arrangement with GM at the end of the year and begin running Toyotas the following season. This partnership would eventually bring Toyota their first Cup Series championship with Kyle Busch in 2015. Along with five Cup Series championships, Gibbs has also won three Xfinity Series championships and one ARCA Racing Series crown. The team has amassed 200 NASCAR Cup Series victories, 195 Xfinity Series wins, and 23 ARCA Racing Series victories.

In the NASCAR Cup Series, the team currently fields four full-time entries with the Toyota Camry: the No. 11 for Denny Hamlin, the No. 18 for Kyle Busch, the No. 19 for Martin Truex Jr., and the No. 20 for Christopher Bell. In the Xfinity Series, the team currently fields three full-time entries with the Toyota Supra: the No. 18 for multiple drivers, the No. 19 for Brandon Jones, the No. 54 for Ty Gibbs. The team has fielded Cup and Xfinity cars in the past for many NASCAR drivers, including Hall of Famers Dale Jarrett, Tony Stewart, Bobby Labonte, and Matt Kenseth, and others such as Carl Edwards, J.J. Yeley, Jason Leffler, Erik Jones, Daniel Suárez, Joey Logano, Daniel Hemric, Brian Vickers, Brian Scott, Elliott Sadler, Harrison Burton, Riley Herbst, Coy Gibbs, Mike McLaughlin, and Mike Bliss.

Cup Series
In the NASCAR Cup Series, which has been sponsored by Winston, Nextel, Sprint, and Monster Energy during the existence of Joe Gibbs Racing, the team has won 200 races and five championships. It has won at least one race each year since its inception except its first season in 1992. In 2019, Gibbs set a team record for wins in a single season, winning 19 of 36 races, besting Hendrick Motorsports' record of 18 from 2007. The team currently sits third to Hendrick Motorsports and Petty Enterprises in total Cup Series wins for a single organization.

Cup Series wins

. – Gibbs won driver's championship

Non-points exhibition race wins

Wins by driver
Eleven drivers have won at least one points race for Joe Gibbs Racing in the Cup Series. Kyle Busch and Denny Hamlin account for the majority of race wins, having won 56 and 48 races, respectively. Daniel Suárez won an exhibition race while driving for Gibbs but never won a points race.

Wins by track
Gibbs has won on 27 of the 33 tracks on which it has competed in the Cup Series, the exceptions being North Wilkesboro Speedway, Nashville Superspeedway, World Wide Technology Raceway, Indianapolis Road Course, Circuit of the Americas, and Road America.

Xfinity Series
Joe Gibbs first fielded entries in the then-Busch Series in the late 1990s, making one start in 1997 with Bobby Labonte in the No. 18 at Charlotte. He bought the No. 44 team from Labonte and ran the car full-time in 1998, predominantly with Labonte and Tony Stewart driving. Labonte scored the team's only win at Darlington in his first start in the car. The team ran part-time for 1999, before returning with two full-time teams beginning in 2000. In 2001, Mike McLaughlin earned the team's second win at Talladega in the No. 20. Three years later, Mike Bliss scored the team's third win at Charlotte. With the addition of Denny Hamlin in 2006 and Joey Logano and Kyle Busch in 2008, the organization began winning multiple races per year, scoring at least nine victories every season through 2021 and winning the drivers' championship in 2009 (Busch), 2016 (Daniel Suárez), and 2021 (Daniel Hemric).

Busch won 90 races for the team from 2008 to 2021, finishing his career in the series with 102 total race wins. Additionally, Logano, Hamlin, Christopher Bell, Erik Jones, Ty Gibbs, Tony Stewart, Brandon Jones, Harrison Burton, Matt Kenseth, Daniel Suárez, Sam Hornish Jr., and Ryan Preece all won multiple races for Gibbs during this period.

Xfinity Series wins
. – Gibbs won driver's championship

Non-points exhibition race wins
In 2016, NASCAR announced that Dash 4 Cash races would feature two heat races that determine the starting grid for the main event. Gibbs drivers won four of the eight heats held over the course the four Dash 4 Cash races.

Wins by driver
Twenty drivers have won at least one points race in a Gibbs car, with Kyle Busch accounting for 90 of the 195 series victories. Joey Logano, Denny Hamlin, Christopher Bell, Erik Jones, and Ty Gibbs account for anywhere from 8 to 18 wins apiece. Hamlin and Busch each won an additional race for the team but were disqualified after failing post-race inspection in those races.

Wins by track
Gibbs has won on 31 different tracks in the series, with the most wins coming at Texas Motor Speedway and Phoenix Raceway. Tracks on which the team has competed and not won include Rockingham Speedway, Nashville Fairgrounds Speedway, Hickory Speedway, Myrtle Beach Speedway, South Boston Speedway, Pikes Peak International Raceway, Nazareth Speedway, Memphis International Raceway, Circuit Gilles Villeneuve, Mid-Ohio Sports Car Course, Indianapolis Road Course, Portland International Raceway, and the Charlotte Roval.

ARCA Series

ARCA Series wins
. – Gibbs won driver's championship

All-time statistics
As of 7/21/22 – Includes NASCAR's Cup Series, Xfinity Series, Truck Series, and ARCA Series races
 Starts: 4,925* 
 Cup Series: 2,815; Xfinity Series: 1,932; Truck Series: 65; ARCA Series: 113
 Races Completed: 2,027
 Cup Series: 1,060; Xfinity Series: 802; Truck Series: 60; ARCA Series: 105
 Wins: 411
 Cup Series: 198; Xfinity Series: 190; Truck Series: 0; ARCA Series: 23
 Poles: 327
 Cup Series: 133; Xfinity Series: 173; Truck Series: 0; ARCA Series: 21
 Top 5s: 1,573* 
 Cup Series: 841; Xfinity Series: 660; Truck Series: 6; ARCA Series: 66
 Top 10s: 2,573* 
 Cup Series: 1,381; Xfinity Series: 1,085; Truck Series: 21; ARCA Series: 86
 Championships: 9
 Cup Series: 5; Xfinity Series: 3; Truck Series: 0; ARCA Series: 1
* – includes results by multiple teams; sometimes as many as 4 teams per race

See also
 List of all-time NASCAR Cup Series winners
 List of NASCAR race wins by Petty Enterprises
 List of NASCAR race wins by Hendrick Motorsports
 List of NASCAR race wins by Kyle Busch
 List of NASCAR race wins by Tony Stewart

References

Joe Gibbs Racing
NASCAR race wins
Joes Gibbs Racing race wins
NASCAR race wins